Huanggutun railway station was a railway station on the Qinhuangdao–Shenyang High-Speed Railway. It was located in Shenyang, in the Liaoning province of China. It closed to passenger service in 2012, and closed to freight in 2017 during construction of the Beijing–Shenyang high-speed railway.

See also
Huanggutunzhan station, on Line 9 (Shenyang Metro)
Huanggutun incident in 1928, near the station

References

Transport in Shenyang
Buildings and structures in Shenyang
Railway stations in Liaoning
Stations on the Beijing–Harbin Railway
Stations on the Harbin–Dalian High-Speed Railway
Stations on the Beijing–Harbin High-Speed Railway